The New Red Sandstone, chiefly in British geology, is composed of beds of red sandstone and associated rocks laid down throughout the Permian (300  million years ago) to the end of the Triassic (about 200 million years ago), that underlie the Jurassic-Triassic age Penarth Group.  The name distinguishes it from the Old Red Sandstone which is largely Devonian in age, and with which it was originally confused due to their similar composition.

Its upper layers consist of mudstones, but most of the formation consists of reddish to yellowish sandstones, interbedded with rare evaporite minerals such as halite and gypsum. These indicate deposition within a hot and arid palaeo-environment, such as a desert or sabkha.

Geographical distribution 
The New Red Sandstone was originally identified in Scotland, at quarries in Elgin. It covers large parts of the Moray Firth Basin. In this area it overlies the Old Red Sandstone unconformably (missing the intervening rocks), and both sandstones were used extensively in architecture in the Highlands and Islands of Scotland. It also covers much of central England, where it generally forms a low-lying plain except for the Mid Severn Sandstone Plateau. There are numerous escarpments forming small prominent hills within this area. The sandstone also underlies parts of Lancashire and Cumbria, and east of the Pennines it extends through Nottinghamshire and central Yorkshire. Smaller outcrops occur in other parts of Britain such as the Red Cliffs of Dawlish and East Devon.

Lithology 
In terms of its lithology, the New Red Sandstone comprises true sandstones, mudrocks and evaporite strata. The sandstone units are monomineralic, consisting only of quartz grains (negligible amounts of other minerals may be present), and they are cemented together with the ferric iron oxide haematite (Fe2O3). The presence of this particular iron oxide is evidence for a terrestrial environment of deposition such as a desert, and gives the rocks the red colour which they are named after. The common effect of rusting produces exactly the same deposit, but as a result of a different process. The sandstone units generally lack fossils (as do most terrestrial rocks). The grains in the member have a high degree of sphericity, are very well sorted and typically have a small size range.

The NRS is a texturally mature rock.  Certain units of the New Red Sandstone (e.g. Hopeman Sandstone Formation and Helsby Sandstone Formation) feature commonly as building stone due to their abundance and mechanical strength.

Fossil content 
The New Red Sandstone has yielded many fossils, including the world-famous Elgin Reptiles. These are late Permian to Late Triassic in age, and include mammal-like reptiles and some of the earliest predecessors of dinosaurs. An earliest Permian (Asselian) fauna is known from the Kenilworth Sandstone Formation of the English Midlands, including primitive synapsids and temnospondyl amphibians.

Building uses 

Many ancient buildings of Devon Red Sandstone can be found in Exeter the ancient capital of Devon, notably the castle, Roman / medieval city walls, several churches and many buildings of the Cathedral Close. The local quarry was at Heavitree by which name the local sandstone – actually a type of breccia – is generally known.

 Rougemont Castle, Exeter, Devon, c.1068 with earlier elements
 Crediton Parish Church founded c910, dates from c.1130 with earlier elements
 St Petrock's Church, Exeter, Devon, before 11C 
 St Olave's Church, Exeter, Devon founded 1053 
 Bishops Palace, Paignton, Devon 
 St Mary's Church, Totnes, Devon, c 1450 
 Royal Albert Memorial Museum, Exeter, Devon, 1868

See also 

 British Isles#Geography
 Bunter (geology)
 Buntsandstein
 Geology of Great Britain
 Haffield Breccia
 Old Red Sandstone

References

Further reading 
 Palmer, Douglas.  Earth Time:  Exploring the Deep Past from Victorian England to the Grand Canyon.  Chichester:  John Wiley & Sons, Ltd, 2005.   pp. 137–8, 159.
 Durrance, E & Laming, D.J.C. The Geology of Devon University of Exeter Press 1982 .

Geologic formations of the United Kingdom
Permian System of Europe
Permian United Kingdom
Sandstone formations
Stratigraphy of the United Kingdom
Triassic System of Europe
Triassic United Kingdom